Brooke Patterson (born 11 October 1989) is an Australian rules footballer who played for the Melbourne Football Club in the AFL Women's competition. She was drafted by Melbourne with their thirteen selection and 104th overall in the 2016 AFL Women's draft. She made her debut in the nineteen point win against  at Ikon Park in round two of the 2017 season. She played the next two matches before missing the round five match against  due to a hamstring injury. She returned for the final round match against  at Casey Fields to finish with four matches for the season.

Melbourne signed Patterson for the 2018 season during the trade period in May 2017.

References

External links 

1989 births
Living people
Melbourne Football Club (AFLW) players
Australian rules footballers from Victoria (Australia)
Darebin Falcons players